The 2017 Mackay Cutters season was the tenth in the club's history. Coached by Steve Sheppard and captained by Andrew Davey and Setaimata Sa, they competed in the QRL's Intrust Super Cup. The club missed the finals for the fourth consecutive season, finishing eighth.

Season summary
Following a wooden spoon season in 2016, the Cutters underwent a major roster overhaul, led by new head coach Steve Sheppard. The club's key signings included former Samoa and New Zealand international Setaimata Sa and former NRL player Jayden Hodges. Sa was awarded the co-captaincy of the team, alongside er Andrew Davey. Hodges first season with Mackay was short lived after he tore his ACL in the team's first trial in February, ruling him out for the season.

The Cutters did not find much success in the first half of the season, winning just four of their first 12 games. Six wins, and two draws, from their final 11 games saw them fight for a finals spot but they finished short, four points outside of the Top 6 in eighth spot. Co-captain Andrew Davey was named the club's Player of the Year at the end of the season. In 2017, the Cutters used just two North Queensland Cowboys-contracted players, the least in club history.

Squad List

2017 squad

Squad movement

Gains

Losses

Fixtures

Regular season

Statistics

Honours

Club
Player of the Year: Andrew Davey
Players' Player: Nick Brown
Rookie of the Year: Cooper Bambling
Club Person of the Year: Jodie Grosskreutz

References

2017 in Australian rugby league
2017 in rugby league by club
Mackay Cutters